Madad may refer to:
 Afsar Madad Naqvi, (1933 – 1997), Pakistani sculptor
 Madad Ali, father of Noor Jehan
 Syra Madad, American pathogen preparedness expert
 Operation Madad (Indian Navy), a disaster relief operation undertaken by the Indian Armed Forces in the aftermath of the 2004 Indian Ocean tsunami
 Operation Madad (Pakistan Navy), Pakistan Navy's assistance and SAR operation to support effected areas of Pakistan following the 2010 Pakistan floods
 Medad, Iran